LeBoeuf Creek or Leboeuf Creek may refer to:

Leboeuf Creek (Missouri), a tributary of the Gasconade River
LeBoeuf Creek (Pennsylvania), a tributary of French Creek